The Copper Peacock and Other Stories is a short story collection by British writer Ruth Rendell.

Contents 
The collection contains nine stories:

 "A Pair of Yellow Lillies"
 "Paperwork"
 "Mother's Help"
 "Long Live the Queen"
 "Dying Happy"
 "The Copper Peacock"
 "Weeds"
 "The Fish-Sitter"
 "An Unwanted Woman" (an Inspector Wexford story)

References

External links
 The Copper Peacock and Other Stories on Internet Archive
 The Copper Peacock and Other Stories on Goodreads.

1991 short story collections
Short story collections by Ruth Rendell
Hutchinson (publisher) books
Inspector Wexford series